This is a list of British television related events from 1984.

Events

January
4 January – Pat Phoenix leaves Coronation Street for the second and final time as Elsie Tanner as she goes to live with old flame Bill Gregory in Portugal, having been in the show since its inception in 1960.
7 January 
Fraggle Rock makes its UK debut on ITV, nearly a year after airing in the US and Canada. The series is a co-production by TVS, CBC, HBO and Henson Associates.
Daytime Ceefax transmissions are renamed Pages from Ceefax following the decision by Radio Times to begin listing daytime Ceefax broadcasts.
9 January – The children's animated series Towser makes its debut on ABC in Australia, several months before debuting in the UK. 
16 January – Satellite Television Limited is renamed Sky Channel.
30 January – The BBC's Panorama documentary series airs "Maggie's Militant Tendency" which claims links between several Conservative MPs and far-right organisations both in Britain and Europe. Two of the MPs named, Neil Hamilton and Gerald Howarth subsequently sue the BBC for slander. In 1986, after the BBC withdraws from the case, Hamilton is awarded £20,000 in damages.
31 January – The long-running comedy sketch show Alas Smith and Jones makes its debut on BBC2.

February
6 February – The short-lived US action series Blue Thunder, based on the 1983 hit movie of the same name makes its UK debut on BBC1. 
14 February – An estimated 24 million viewers watch Torvill and Dean win Gold at the 1984 Winter Olympics skating to Ravel's Boléro.
26 February – Debut of the long-running puppet comedy series Spitting Image on ITV.

March
10 March – The US teenage science-fiction series Whiz Kids makes its UK debut on ITV which aired as a Saturday feature by most ITV regions. Exceptions are Ulster which airs the series on Sundays and TVS which airs it at a later date.
16 March – Peter Davison's last serial as the Fifth Doctor in Doctor Who, The Caves of Androzani finishes, Colin Baker becomes the Sixth Doctor in the same episode.
22 March 
Colin Baker makes his first full appearance as the Sixth Doctor in the Doctor Who serial The Twin Dilemma.
Horse racing is shown on Channel 4 for the first time.
24 March – The Price Is Right makes its UK debut on ITV. It is produced by Central in association with Mark Goodson Productions and Talbot Television and is presented by Leslie Crowther.
26 March – Return of the popular 1950s panel game show What's My Line? after 20 years, with original host Eamonn Andrews in the chair, now on ITV.
29 March – The Entertainment Network, Music Box and Screensport launches on cable.

April
 5 April – Industrial action by members of the Entertainments Trade Alliance results in all of that day's BBC1 programmes being cancelled.
15 April – Comedian and magician Tommy Cooper dies from a fatal heart attack on live television at the age of 63, during Live from Her Majesty's.
 21 April – The Saturday Picture Show replaces Get Set as the BBC's Summer Saturday morning magazine show. Its running time is extended and begins at the earlier time of 8:45am.
22 April – The network television premiere of Hugh Hudson's 1981 Oscar-winning biographical drama film Chariots of Fire on BBC1, starring Ben Cross, Ian Charleson, Nigel Davenport, John Gielgud, Patrick Magee, Nigel Havers, Ian Holm and Alice Krige.
28 April – ITV airs the first episode of Robin of Sherwood, produced by HTV and starring Michael Praed as Robin Hood.

May
6 May – Debut of the long-running light entertainment series Surprise Surprise on ITV, presented by Cilla Black. 
10 May – The five-part BBC Schools French language adventure series La Marée et ses Secrets (The Tide and its Secrets) is first broadcast which is repeated each year until 1993. The series continues on 14 June.
12 May – The short-lived US science-fiction series Automan makes its UK debut on BBC1, starring Desi Arnaz Jr., Chuck Wagner, Heather McNair and Robert Lansing.
28 May – BBC1 airs the network television premiere of Harold Ramis' 1980 American sports comedy film Caddyshack, starring Chevy Chase, Bill Murray, Michael O'Keefe, Cindy Morgan, Rodney Dangerfield and Ted Knight.

June
4 June 
The hit animated series Danger Mouse is broadcast on children's cable network Nickelodeon in the US, becoming the first British cartoon to air on that channel and one of the earliest to be in syndication there. 
The short-lived US fantasy series Manimal makes its UK debut on BBC1, starring Simon MacCorkindale.
7 June – The first edition of Crimewatch UK is broadcast on BBC1. The first case to be featured on the show is the murder of Colette Aram which had occurred the previous year. A man is finally charged with the murder in 2009 and is sentenced to life imprisonment in January 2010 after pleading guilty.
19 June – The final episode of Ben Elton's anarchic comedy series The Young Ones is broadcast on BBC2 in spectacular fashion by blowing up the entire cast after briefly surviving a bus crash.
23 June – ITV broadcasts the rock concert New Brighton Rock recorded at the event staged in the seaside resort of New Brighton, Merseyside over two days on 21 and 22 May.

July
27 July – The final edition of Sixty Minutes is broadcast on BBC1, ending less than a year after it first went on the air.
28–29 July – BBC2 hosts Jazz on a Summer's Day, a weekend of programmes devoted to jazz music.
28 July–12 August – The BBC broadcasts the 1984 Summer Olympic Games. Due to the Games taking place in Los Angeles, BBC1 stays on the air into the night to provide live coverage of the major events.
30 July 
BBC1's teatime news programme reverts to its original name of Evening News and to its original broadcast time of 5:40pm. The regional news programmes follow broadcasting for 20 minutes from 5:55pm. This is a stop-gap measure and continues for five weeks until the launch of BBC1's new teatime newshour.
ITV begins broadcasting the US science-fiction miniseries "V" and "V" The Final Battle.  The alien invasion drama starring Marc Singer, Faye Grant and Jane Badler is shown over five consecutive nights.

August
4–12 August – During the second week of the 1984 Summer Olympic Games, the BBC extends its live coverage until around 4am. Rather than closing down, they fill the gap with Ceefax Olympics AM which provides news from the Games to fill the gap between the end of live coverage and the start of Olympic Breakfast Time. This is the first time that Ceefax pages are broadcast overnight.
25–26 August – For the second time, BBC2 Rocks Around the Clock.
27 August – Technicians at Thames walk out on strike over the use of new cameras and editing equipment along with overtime payments for transmission staff. The strike lasts for two weeks but the station is off the air for just one day over the August Bank Holiday weekend. Management and administration staff take over their roles, broadcasting a skeleton service.

September
1 September 
The Children's Channel and Premiere launches on cable.
Debut of the game show Bob's Full House on BBC1, presented by Bob Monkhouse. 
2 September – The two-part US miniseries Lace makes its debut on ITV, starring Phoebe Cates.
3 September 
BBC1's teatime news hour is relaunched and now runs from 6pm until 7pm. A new 30-minute long news programme the Six O'Clock News is launched and this is followed by a longer regional news magazine which is expanded to 25 minutes.
The network television premiere of the 1979 science fiction adventure film Star Trek: The Motion Picture on ITV, starring William Shatner, Leonard Nimoy, DeForest Kelley and Persis Khambatta.
7 September – Les Dawson becomes the new host of Blankety Blank on BBC1. 
11 September – After making its debut in Australia, Towser finally makes its debut on ITV.
18 September – The network television premiere of Mel Brooks' 1974 horror comedy film Young Frankenstein on BBC2, starring Gene Wilder and Marty Feldman.
23 September – The single TV drama play about a nuclear war, Threads airs on BBC2.

October
5 October 
The first programme produced by Maddocks Cartoon Productions The Family-Ness makes its debut on BBC1.
BBC2 broadcasts an Open University programme at teatime for the final time.
6 October – TV Times Magazine is rebranded back to its original TV Times name.
7 October–December – Pirate television station Thameside TV broadcasts illicitly from south London.
8 October 
BBC2 launches a full afternoon service, consisting primarily of repeats of Dallas and old feature films.
The Australian soap Prisoner: Cell Block H makes its UK debut when Yorkshire Television becomes the first ITV region to begin airing the programme in a late night slot. It is followed by all other ITV regions over the following five years.
Scottish Television relaunches its regional news programme Scotland Today as a features-led magazine format with the news relegated to brief summaries before and after the programme.
Pirate television station Channel 36 'Late Night London Television', run by Waveview Holdings, begins broadcasting illicitly.
9 October – The children's series based on the books by the Rev. Wilbert Awdry and narrated by Ringo Starr, Thomas the Tank Engine & Friends makes its debut on ITV, becoming one of the most successful children's TV programmes of all time since Postman Pat first went to air on the BBC three years earlier. The show would move to one future station, Cartoon Network in the mid-1990s, before returning to terrestrial television in 2003 and moving to its new permanent future station Channel 5 three years later.
12 October – The US helicopter action series Airwolf makes its UK debut on ITV, starring Jan-Michael Vincent and Ernest Borgnine. 
15 October – Channel 4's output increases by 25%. The weekday schedules now begin at 2:30pm instead of 5pm while weekend airtime starts at 1pm rather than 2pm.
16 October – The Bill airs for the first time on ITV. It debuted last year as a pilot show Woodentop. When the last episode is shown in 2010, it will be the longest-running police procedural in British television history.
17 October – Another strike begins at Thames over the same issue which unions went on strike six weeks earlier and also over new technologies. 
19 October 
A management-operated schedule is introduced. It broadcasts programming between around 1:30pm and around midnight as well as the ITV breakfast service TV-am. For the intervening four hours, instead of schools programmes, Thames viewers were left with a blue screen showing their upcoming emergency schedule and with no access to ITN News, Thames viewers had to make do with short news bulletins. Weekend ITV schedules for the London region are not affected by the strike, with London Weekend Television coming on air on Fridays at 5:15 pm as usual.
Yorkshire Television airs a special documentary on the birth of Prince Harry.
23 October – BBC News presenter Michael Buerk gives a powerful commentary of the famine in Ethiopia which has already claimed thousands of lives and reportedly has the potential to kill as many as seven million people. The news report subsequently leads to the formation of the charity supergroup Band Aid and the No.1 single Do They Know It's Christmas? as well as the Live Aid concerts the following year.

November
3 November 
Following the assassination of Indian Prime Minister Indira Gandhi on 31 October, coverage of her funeral is televised by the BBC and ITV.
The strike at Thames Television finally ends, after 62 film editors agreed to the new conditions while the ACTT agreed as well to start negotiations about the introductions of new technology. Additional episodes of network productions were screened to help clear the backlog.
7 November – BBC1 starts airing season 8 of the US drama series Dallas.
21 November – Debut of Alan Seymour's dramatisation of the 1935 John Masefield children's fantasy adventure novel The Box of Delights. on BBC1, starring Patrick Troughton and Robert Stephens. The six-part series concludes on Christmas Eve.

December
1 December – The Cable Authority comes into existence and on 1 January 1985 it takes over the functions granted to it by the Cable and Broadcasting Act 1984, paving the way for fully commercial cable franchises to be awarded on a city-by-city basis.
10 December – Channel 4 airs An Evening with Mary Tyler Moore, along with episodes of St. Elsewhere and The Betty White Show.
18 December – Bruce Lee's 1973 martial arts action film Enter the Dragon is shown on ITV with its full uncut version and all subsequent airings would be censored.
25 December – The network television premiere of Steven Spielberg's 1981 action adventure blockbuster film Raiders of the Lost Ark on ITV, starring Harrison Ford as Indiana Jones.
26 December 
Joan Hickson makes her debut as Agatha Christie's Miss Marple in BBC1's eponymous series with the first part of a three-part adaptation of The Body in the Library. Part two airs on 27 December and part three on 28 December.
The network television premiere of the 1980 American spoof comedy film Airplane! on ITV, starring Robert Hays, Julie Hagerty, Leslie Nielsen, Lloyd Bridges and Robert Stack.
30 December 
The network television premiere of Kramer vs. Kramer, the 1979 Oscar-winning legal drama film on BBC1, starring Dustin Hoffman and Meryl Streep.
ITV airs the 1977 science-fiction epic film Star Wars for a third time.

Unknown
Telstar TV, the UK's first pirate television station goes on the air in Birmingham. The channel broadcasts for about eight weeks on the BBC2 transmitter in the Northfield and Rubery areas of the city, showing a mixture of films and music videos after BBC2 closes at weekends. It goes unnoticed by the authorities for several weeks much to their embarrassment.

Debuts

BBC1
2 January – Amy (1984)
4 January – Cockles (1984)
8 January – The Thorn Birds (1983)
10 January – The District Nurse (1984–1987)
11 January – Strangers and Brothers (1984)
12 January – Diana (1984)
19 January – The Living Planet (1984)
27 January – Sharon and Elsie (1984–1985)
29 January 
Ever Decreasing Circles (1984–1989)
 Goodbye Mr. Chips (1984)
One by One (1984–1987)
11 February –The Odd Job Man (1984)
15 February – The Farm (1984)
22 February – Moonfleet (1984)
3 March – Driving Ambition (1984)
29 March – Missing from Home (1984)
7 April – The Laughter Show (1984–1991)
12 May – Automan (1983–1984)
4 June – Manimal (1983)
7 June – Crimewatch (1984–2017)
25 June – Round and Round (1984)
9 July – The Kids of Degrassi Street (1979–1986)
1 September – Bob's Full House (1984–1990)
3 September 
North West Tonight (1984–present)
Inside Ulster (1984–1996)
London Plus (1984–1989)
Six O'Clock News (1984–present)
4 September 
The Invisible Man (1984)
The Lenny Henry Show (1984–1988)
6 September – The Magnificent Evans (1984)
10 September – Dungeons & Dragons (1983-1985)
12 September – Cold Warrior (1984)
14 September – Hartbeat (1984–1993)
15 September – The Tripods (1984–1985)
24 September – Beat the Teacher (1984–1988)
5 October – The Family-Ness (1984–1985)
14 October – Big Deal (1984–1986)
18 November – The Prisoner of Zenda (1984)
21 November – The Box of Delights (1984)
6 December 
The Front Line (1984–1985)
The Secret Servant (1984)
10 December –Hilary (1984–1986)
21 December – City Lights (1984–1991)
24 December – The ChuckleHounds (1984–1986)
26 December – Miss Marple (1984–1992)

BBC2
5 January – The Hello Goodbye Man (1984)
13 January – A Family Man (1984)
31 January – Alas Smith and Jones (1984–1998)
12 February – The Weather in the Streets (1984)
14 March – Swallows and Amazons Forever! (1984)
16 March – The Treatment (1984)
19 March – The Fainthearted Feminist (1984)
31 March – 4 American Composers (1984) 
6 May – Sharing Time (1984)
26 May – Journey into the Shadows (1984)
20 June – Leaving (1984–1985)
11 July – A Winter Harvest (1984)
10 September – Bootle Saddles (1984)
12 September – Sea of Faith (1984)
14 September – Freud (1984)
18 September – Look and Read: Badger Girl (1984)
23 September – Threads (1984)
28 September – A Taste of Honey (1984)
1 October – Doctor Fischer of Geneva (1984)
22 October – Lame Ducks (1984–1986)
29 October 
Laugh??? I Nearly Paid My Licence Fee (1984)
Ken Hom's Chinese Cookery (1984–1987)
14 November – Oxbridge Blues (1984)
27 November – The Clairvoyant (1984-1986)
3 December –The New Statesman (1984–1985)
17 December – Comrade Dad (1984–1986)
18 December - Open to Question
Unknown – A Woman Calling (1984)

ITV
7 January 
Fraggle Rock (1984–1990)
Child's Play (1984–1988)
8 January – Love and Marriage (1984–1986)
9 January 
The Jewel in the Crown (1984)
Chocky (1984)
19 January – The Steam Video Company (1984)
13 February – Duty Free (1984–1986)
17 February – Killer (1984)
22 February – The Country Diary of an Edwardian Lady (1984)
26 February – Spitting Image (1984–1996)
7 March – Fresh Fields (1984–1986)
9 March – Shroud for a Nightingale (1984)
10 March – Whiz Kids (1983–1984)
24 March – The Price Is Right (1984–1988 ITV, 1989–1990 Sky1, 1995–2001, 2006–2007 ITV, 2017 Channel 4)
26 March – Charlie (1984)
28 March – Letty (1984)
29 March – Benny (1984)
2 April – The Kit Curran Radio Show (1984–1986)
10 April – How Dare You (1984–1987)
16 April – The Master of Ballantrae (1984)
18 April – Mr. Palfrey of Westminster (1984–1985)
24 April – The Adventures of Sherlock Holmes (1984–1988, 1991–1994)
28 April – Robin of Sherwood (1984–1986)
6 May – Surprise Surprise (1984–2001, 2012–2015)
31 May – Scarecrow and Mrs. King (1983–1985)
6 June – Sorrell and Son (1984)
9 June – Aspel and Company (1984–1993)
15 June – Pull the Other One (1984)
26 June – The Brief (1984)
8 July – Weekend Playhouse (1984)
12 July – Poor Little Rich Girls (1984)
13 July – Emu's All Live Pink Windmill Show (1984–1989)
17 July – The Lonelyhearts Kid (1984)
26 July – Starstrider (1984–1985)
27 July –I Thought You'd Gone (1984)
30 July – V (1983–1985, 2009–2011)
10 August – Annika (1984)
31 August 
Me and My Girl (1984–1988)
Mitch (1984)
Inspector Gadget (1983–1986)
1 September 
Bottle Boys (1984–1985)
The Saturday Starship (1984–1985)
2 September – Lace (1984)
5 September – Hammer House of Mystery and Suspense (1984)
11 September - Towser (1984) 
24 September – Tripper's Day (1984)
1 October – The Glory Boys (1984)
8 October – Prisoner Cell Block H Yorkshire region only (1979–1987)
9 October – Thomas the Tank Engine and Friends (ITV and Cartoon Network 1984–2006, Five 2006–present)
12 October – Airwolf (1984-1987)
13 October – Wide Awake Club (1984–1989)
16 October – The Bill (1984–2010)
17 October – Rub-a-Dub-Dub (1984)
5 November – Tickle on the Tum (1984–1988)
7 November 
Chish 'n' Fips (1984–1987)
Travelling Man (1984–1985)
8 November – Stanley Bagshaw (1984)
9 November – Eh Brian! It's a Whopper (1984)
9 December – The Ebony Tower (1984)
26 December – Kim (1984)
Unknown 
We Love TV (1984–1986)
Masquerade (1983–1984)

Channel 4
 3 January 
The Far Pavilions (1984)
Katri, Girl of the Meadows (1984)
6 January – Dream Stuffing (1984)
22 March – Channel 4 Racing (1984–2016)
5 April – Caught in a Free State (1984)
3 May – Edwin (1984)
14 May – Scully (1984)
24 May – American Caesar (1984) (documentary)
14 July – They Came from Somewhere Else (1984)
10 September – Chance in a Million (1984–1986)
27 September – The House (1984)
22 October – Fairly Secret Army (1984–1986)
21 November – Wil Cwac Cwac (1984–1986)
5 December – Puccini (1984)

Channels

New channels

Rebranded channels

Television shows

Returning this year after a break of one year or longer
26 March – What's My Line? (1951–1964, 1984–1996)
9 September Thunderbirds (1972–1980, 1984-1987)

Continuing television shows

1920s
BBC Wimbledon (1927–1939, 1946–2019, 2021–present)

1930s
The Boat Race (1938–1939, 1946–2019)
BBC Cricket (1939, 1946–1999, 2020–2024)

1940s
Come Dancing (1949–1998)

1950s
What's My Line? (1951–1964, 1984–1996)
Panorama (1953–present)
What the Papers Say (1956–2008)
The Sky at Night (1957–present)
Blue Peter (1958–present)
Grandstand (1958–2007)

1960s
Coronation Street (1960–present)
Songs of Praise (1961–present)
Doctor Who (1963–1989, 1996, 2005–present)
World in Action (1963–1998)
Top of the Pops (1964–2006)
Match of the Day (1964–present)
Crossroads (1964–1988, 2001–2003)
Play School (1964–1988)
Mr. and Mrs. (1965–1999)
World of Sport (1965–1985)
Jackanory (1965–1996, 2006)
Sportsnight (1965–1997)
Call My Bluff (1965–2005)
The Money Programme (1966–2010)
The Big Match (1968–2002)

1970s
The Old Grey Whistle Test (1971–1987)
The Two Ronnies (1971–1987, 1991, 1996, 2005)
Pebble Mill at One (1972–1986)
Rainbow (1972–1992, 1994–1997)
Emmerdale (1972–present)
Newsround (1972–present)
Weekend World (1972–1988)
We Are the Champions (1973–1987)
Last of the Summer Wine (1973–2010)
That's Life! (1973–1994)
Wish You Were Here...? (1974–2003)
Arena (1975–present)
Jim'll Fix It (1975–1994)
One Man and His Dog (1976–present)
3-2-1 (1978–1988)
Grange Hill (1978–2008)
Ski Sunday (1978–present)
Terry and June (1979–1987)
The Book Tower (1979–1989)
Blankety Blank (1979–1990, 1997–2002)
The Paul Daniels Magic Show (1979–1994)
Antiques Roadshow (1979–present)
Question Time (1979–present)

1980s
Play Your Cards Right (1980–1987, 1994–1999, 2002–2003) 
Family Fortunes (1980–2002, 2006–2015, 2020–present) 
Juliet Bravo (1980–1985)
Cockleshell Bay (1980–1986)
Children in Need (1980–present)
Finders Keepers (1981–1985)
Freetime (1981–1985)
Game for a Laugh (1981–1985)
Tenko (1981–1985)
That's My Boy (1981–1986)
Razzamatazz (1981–1987)
Bergerac (1981–1991)
Odd One Out (1982–1985)
On Safari (1982–1985)
'Allo 'Allo! (1982–1992)
Wogan (1982–1992)
Saturday Superstore (1982–1987)
The Tube (1982–1987)
Brookside (1982–2003)
Countdown (1982–present)
Let's Pretend (TV series) (1982–1988)
No. 73 (1982–1988)
Timewatch (1982–present)
Right to Reply (1982–2001)
Up the Elephant and Round the Castle (1983–1985)
Inspector Gadget (1983–1986)
Bananaman (1983–1986)
Just Good Friends (1983–1986)
Philip Marlowe, Private Eye (1983–1986)
Breadwinners (1983–1986)
Breakfast Time (1983–1989)
Dramarama (1983–1989)
Don't Wait Up (1983–1990)
Good Morning Britain (1983–1992)
First Tuesday (1983–1993)
Highway (1983–1993)
Blockbusters (1983–93, 1994–95, 1997, 2000–01, 2012, 2019)

Ending this year
 12 January – Shelley (1979–1984, 1988–1992)
 14 January – Agatha Christie's Partners in Crime (1983–1984)
 17 February – A Fine Romance (1981–1984)
 29 March – Crown Court (1972–1984)
 2 April – Alphabet Zoo (1983–1984)
 3 April – The Jewel in the Crown (1984) 
 14 April – The Saturday Show (1982–1984)
 11 June – Rentaghost (1976–1984)
 19 June – The Young Ones (1982–1984)
 27 July – Sixty Minutes (1983–1984)
 16 October – Towser (1984)
 20 November – Rub-a-Dub-Dub (1984)
 24 November – The Gentle Touch (1980–1984)
 11 December – On Safari (1982–1984)
 20 December – Screen Test (1969–1984) 
 21 December – Crackerjack (1955–1984, 2020–present)
 22 December – Punchlines (1981–1984)
 30 December – Thunderbirds Weekends (1981-1983)
 31 December – Katri, Girl of the Meadows (1984)
 31 December – Give Us a Break (1983–1984)

Births
 6 February – Gemma Merna, actress
 29 February – Rakhee Thakrar, actress
 7 March – Rachel Rice, actress and reality show contestant
 28 March – Nikki Sanderson, actress
 22 April – Michelle Ryan, actress
 19 August – Simon Bird, actor
 27 October – Kelly Osbourne, singer
 16 November – Gemma Atkinson, actress and model
 25 December – Georgia Tennant, actress

Deaths

See also
 1984 in British music
 1984 in British radio
 1984 in the United Kingdom
 List of British films of 1984

References